Kuging is a village in Upper Siang district of Arunachal Pradesh, India.

References

Villages in Upper Siang district